Kgalema Motlanthe took oath as President of South Africa on 25 September 2008. Following is the list of his cabinet ministers.

Cabinet

|}

Deputy Ministers
 Foreign Affairs: Aziz Pahad
 Foreign Affairs: Susan van der Merwe
 Defence: Fezile Bhengu
 Home Affairs : Malusi Gigaba
 Agriculture and Land Affairs: Dirk du Toit
 Arts and Culture: Ntombazana Botha
 Communications: Radhakrishna Padayachie
 Correctional Services: Loretta Jacobus
 Environmental Affairs and Tourism: Thizwilondi Mabudafhasi
 Health: Molefi Sefularo
 Justice and Constitutional Development : Johnny de Lange
 Provincial and Local Government : Nomatyala Hangana
 Public Works : Ntopile Kganyago
 Safety and Security : Susan Shabangu
 Science and Technology: Derek Hanekom
 Social Development : Jean Swanson-Jacobs
 Sport and Recreation: Gert Oosthuizen
 Trade and Industry: Rob Davies
 Trade and Industry: Elizabeth Thabethe

References

Cabinets of South Africa
2008 establishments in South Africa
2009 disestablishments in South Africa
Cabinets established in 2008
Cabinets disestablished in 2009